A list of American films released in 1977.

Annie Hall won the Academy Award for Best Picture. The highest-grossing film was Star Wars.



A-B

C-G

H-M

N-S

T-Z

See also
 1977 in American television
 1977 in the United States

External links

1977 films at the Internet Movie Database
List of 1977 box office number-one films in the United States

1977
Films
Lists of 1977 films by country or language